is a 1996 Japanese anime television series animated by Nippon Animation as the 22nd entry of the World Masterpiece Theater staple. The anime is based on the 1940 novel Lassie Come-Home by Eric Knight and also the second animated Lassie series ever produced, since Lassie's Rescue Rangers. The series didn't broadcast in other countries such as France, Germany, Spain, Chile, Brazil, and Italy.

Themes
 Opening Theme:  by Jun Morioka
 Ending Theme:  by Jun Morioka

Episodes

References

External links 
Official Site at Nippon Animation 

1996 anime television series debuts
Adventure anime and manga
Animated television series about dogs
Lassie television series
World Masterpiece Theater series
Television shows set in England
Television series set in the 1930s